Bradley Wilfred Schlegel (born July 22, 1968) is a Canadian former ice hockey defenceman.

Schlegel was born in Kitchener, Ontario. Drafted in 1988 by the Washington Capitals, he also played briefly for the Calgary Flames.  Schlegel also played for the Canadian National Team for many years, and was part of the Canadian Men's Hockey Teams that played in the 1992 and 1994 Winter Olympic Games, and won the Silver Medal both times.

In 1995, Schlegel began playing professional hockey in Austria and Germany.

He is a graduate of Rockway Mennonite Collegiate in Kitchener, Ontario.

Career statistics

Regular season and playoffs

International

External links

1968 births
Living people
Baltimore Skipjacks players
Calgary Flames players
Canadian ice hockey defencemen
EC VSV players
Hannover EC players
Hannover Scorpions players
Ice hockey people from Ontario
Sportspeople from Kitchener, Ontario
Ice hockey players at the 1992 Winter Olympics
Ice hockey players at the 1994 Winter Olympics
Kölner Haie players
London Knights players
Medalists at the 1992 Winter Olympics
Medalists at the 1994 Winter Olympics
Olympic ice hockey players of Canada
Olympic medalists in ice hockey
Olympic silver medalists for Canada
Saint John Flames players
Schwenninger Wild Wings players
Washington Capitals draft picks
Washington Capitals players
Canadian expatriate ice hockey players in Austria
Canadian expatriate ice hockey players in Germany